George Efythron Joannides (July 5, 1922 – March 9, 1990) was a Central Intelligence Agency officer who in 1963 was the chief of the Psychological Warfare branch of the agency's JMWAVE station in Miami, and in 1978 was the agency's liaison to the United States House Select Committee on Assassinations.

Career
Joannides attended the City College of New York and St. John's University School of Law. He joined the CIA in 1952. By 1963 he was chief of the Psychological Warfare branch of the Central Intelligence Agency's JM/WAVE station in Miami, with a staff of 24 and a budget of $1.5 million. In that role, he was also known as "Howard", "Mr. Howard", and "Walter Newby". Joannides directed and financed Directorio Revolucionario Estudantil (DRE), or Student Revolutionary Directorate, a group of Cuban exiles whose officers had contact with Lee Harvey Oswald in the months before the assassination of President John F. Kennedy on November 22, 1963. By some accounts, fashioned with the "plausible deniability" typical of CIA operations, the plan was designed to link Oswald to Castro's government, without disclosing the CIA's role. He left the agency in 1976 to start an immigration-law practice in Washington, DC.

In 1978 the CIA summoned Joannides to serve as the agency's liaison to the United States House Select Committee on Assassinations, in specific regard to the death of President Kennedy. Washington Post reporter Jefferson Morley wrote that, "the spy withheld information about his own actions in 1963 from the congressional investigators he was supposed to be assisting. It wasn't until 2001, 38 years after Kennedy's death, that Joannides' support for the Cuban exiles, who clashed with Oswald and monitored him, came to light." Joainnides retired permanently from the CIA in November 1978. In July 1981 he was awarded the Career Intelligence Medal.

In 2013 John R. Tunheim and Thomas E. Samoluk wrote in the Boston Herald: "There is a body of documents that the CIA is still protecting, which should be released. Relying on inaccurate representations made by the CIA in the mid-1990s, the Review Board decided that records related to a deceased CIA agent named George Joannides were not relevant to the Kennedy assassination. Subsequent work by researchers, using other records that were released by the board, demonstrates that these records should be made public."

Personal life and death
In addition to speaking English, Joannides was fluent in Greek and French, and competent in Spanish. He and his wife Violet had three children, and lived in Pinecrest, Florida. In his later years, Joannides had heart problems and moved to Houston, Texas to receive medical treatment from Michael DeBakey. Joannides died on March 9, 1990, aged 67.

References

Further reading 
 Kaiser, D. E. (2009). The road to Dallas: The assassination of John F. Kennedy. Boston: Harvard University Press. 
 Mellen, J. (2005). A farewell to justice. Dulles, VA: Potomac Books.  
 Russell, D. (2003). The man who knew too much. New York: Carroll & Graf. 
 Sabato, L. J. (2013). The Kennedy half-century: The presidency, assassination, and lasting legacy of John F. Kennedy. New York: Bloomsbury. 
 Talbot, D. (2008). Brothers: The hidden history of the Kennedy years. New York: Simon and Schuster. 
 Waldron, L., and Hartmann, T. (2009). Ultimate sacrifice. New York: Basic Books.

External links
 The George Joannides Coverup, Jefferson Morley 

1922 births
1990 deaths
People of the Central Intelligence Agency
People associated with the assassination of John F. Kennedy